10060 may refer to:

Places
 Mount 10060, former name of the Canadian Rockies mountain Hewitt Peak
 Municipality 10060, the geographic code for Saint-Valérien, Quebec
 10060 Amymilne, the asteroid #10060 named "Amymilne"

Other uses
 Former customer service number for China Netcom